Mental Horror is a Brazilian brutal death metal band, formed in Porto Alegre, in 1993. In 1998, the band recorded a demo, titled Extreme Evolution Trauma. In 2000, they signed with Necropolis Records. In 2001, they released their debut studio album Proclaiming Vengeance on Necropolis. The albums Abyss of Hypocrisy and Blemished Redemption followed in 2004 and 2006 respectively.

Members

Current members 
Adriano Martini – guitar, keyboard, vocals
Marcelo Feijó – bass
Iuri Ravel – drums
Marcos Seixas – guitar

Former members 
Aires – guitar
Claudio Cardoso – vocals
Alex Martins – drums
Geber – bass
Rafael Lavandoski - guitar
Iuri Ravel - drums
Robles Dresch – drums
Sandro Moreira – drums

Discography

Studio albums 
Proclaiming Vengeance (2000)
Abyss of Hypocrisy (2004)
Blemished Redemption (2006)

External links 
[ Mental Horror] at Allmusic
Mental Horror at MusicMight
Mental Horror at MySpace

References 

Brazilian death metal musical groups
Musical groups established in 1993
Musical quartets
1993 establishments in Brazil